Hamidreza Garshasbi (also Romanized as "Hamīdrezā Garshāsbī") is an Iranian sports executive and administrator who has been served as president of the Persepolis Football Club. in November 2017, Garshasbi replaced Ali Akbar Taheri as Persepolis acting president. Under leadership of Garshasbi, Persepolis defended their title in Persian Gulf Pro League and advanced to the final of the 2018 AFC Champions League.

References

External links 

 Ministry of Sport and Youth of Iran, Hamidreza Garshasbi (Fa)
 Persepolis 

Living people
Association football executives
Iranian sports executives and administrators
People from Andimeshk
Year of birth missing (living people)